A. carnea may refer to:

 Acrapex carnea, an owlet moth
 Aesculus carnea, a hybrid tree
 Alpinia carnea, a plant that grows from a rhizome
 Amaryllis carnea, a rain lily
 Amphiura carnea, a brittle star
 Androsace carnea, a flowering plant
 Apios carnea, a flowering plant
 Asura carnea, a moth in the subfamily Arctiinae